CantoMundo is an American literary organization founded in 2009 to support Latino poets and poetry. It hosts an annual poetry workshop dedicated to the creation, documentation, and critical analysis of Latinx poetry.

History
CantoMundo was founded in 2009 in San Antonio, Texas when Norma Elia Cantú, Celeste Guzman Mendoza, Pablo Miguel Martínez, Deborah Paredez, and Carmen Tafolla, inspired by the Cave Canem workshops for African-American poets, organized a workshop for Latino writers. The first workshop was held at the National Hispanic Cultural Center in Albuquerque, New Mexico in 2010. From 2011 to 2016 the workshops were held at the University of Texas, Austin. From 2017 to 2019 Columbia University, in New York City served as home for the program and workshops. In August 2019, the University of Arizona Poetry Center formally announced a three-year partnership to host the CantoMundo workshops in Tucson, Arizona beginning in 2020.

CantoMundo is one of over 25 members of the Poetry Coalition, an alliance of nonprofit organizations that aim to promote poetry that is coordinated by the Academy of American Poets. In January 2019, the Academy of American Poets allocated a portion of a $2.2 million endowment from the Andrew W. Mellon Foundation to the Poetry Coalition, some of which went to CantoMundo.

Writing conference
During the four day writing conference, fellows are divided into two groups of 12-15 poets that engage in workshops with invited faculty members, attend keynote lectures, and participate in panel discussions.

During the weekend, fellows also have the opportunity to share their work in front of an audience at the Friday and Saturday night readings which are free and open to the general public. Readings are sponsored by Columbia University's Center for the Study of Race and Ethnicity and the Department of Women’s, Gender, and Sexuality Studies at Barnard College, and the Office of the Dean of Social Science in the Faculty of Arts and Sciences.

Workshop faculty
 2010: Martín Espada and Demetria Martínez. Keynote by Toi Derricotte
 2011: Naomi Ayala and Benjamin Alire Sáenz. Keynote by Vikas Menon
 2012: Aracelis Girmay & Roberto Tejada. Keynote by E. Ethelbert Miller
 2013: Valerie Martinez & Willie Perdomo. Keynote by Natalie Handal
 2014: Rafael Campo & Lorna Dee Cervantes. Keynote by  Sherwin Bitsui
 2015: Sandra María Esteves. Keynote by Tim'm West
 2016: Juan Felipe Herrera & Carmen Tafolla. Keynote by Natasha Trethewey
 2017: Rosa Alcalá & Rigoberto González.
 2018: Daniel Borzutzky & Ada Limon. Keynote by Douglas Kearney
 2019: Monica De La Torre & Natalie Diaz. Keynote by Patricia Smith
 2020: Brenda Cárdenas & Urayoan Noel.

Current fellows (partial list)

 Amy M. Alvarez
 Aldo Amparán
 Diannely Antigua
 John Manuel Arias
 Mario Alejandro Ariza
 Oliver Baez Bendorf
 Amy Sayre Baptista
 Andrea Blancas Beltran
 Sara Borjas
 M. Soledad Caballero
 David Campos
 Andrés Cerpa
 MK Chavez
 Karla Cordero
 Cristina Correa
 Carina del Valle Schorske
 Carolina Ebeid
 Joshua Escobar
 Lauren Espinoza
 Eduardo Gabrieloff
 Suzi F. Garcia
 Ysabel Y. Gonzalez
 Marcelo Hernandez Castillo
 Paul Hlava Ceballos
 Jen Hofer
 Ricardo Maldonado
 Sheila Maldonado
 Carlo Matos
 Jennifer Maritza McCauley
 Jasminne Mendez
 Florencia Milito
 Michelle Moncayo
 Lara Mimosa Montes
 Brenda Nettles Riojas
 Christina Olivares
 José Guadalupe Olivarez
 Maryam Ivette Parhizkar
 Emily Perez
 Zenaida Peterson
 Noel Quiñones
 Gabriel Ramirez
 Reyes Ramirez
 Julian Randall
 Alexandra Lytton Regalado
 Monica Rico
 Joseph Rios
 Raquel Salas Rivera
 Leslie Sainz
 Ruth Irupé Sanabria
 Cintia Santana
 Roberto Santiago
 Nicole Sealey
 Yvette Siegert
 María Fernanda
 Analicia Sotelo
 Michael Torres
 Emma Trelles
 Norma Liliana Valdez
 Dan Vera
 Rich Villar
 Vanessa Angélica Villarreal
 Felicia Zamora

Former fellows (partial list)

 Millicent Borges Accardi
 Elizabeth Acevedo
 Gloria Amescua
 Francisco Aragón
 José Angel Araguz
 Diego Báez
 Rosebud Ben-Oni
 Norma Elia Cantú
 Marcelo Hernandez Castillo
 Eduardo C. Corral
 Anthony Cody
 Cynthia Cruz
 Barbara Brinson Curiel
 Diana Marie Delgado
 Michael Luis Dauro
 Denice Frohman
 Ángel García
 Carmen Gimenez Smith
 Laurie Ann Guerrero
 Celeste Guzman Mendoza
 Juan Luis Guzmán
 Leticia Hernandez-Linares
 Ire'ne Lara Silva
 Raina León
 Manuel Paul López
 Sheryl Luna
 Carl Marcum
 Pablo Miguel Martínez
 Florencia Milito
 Juan Morales
 PaulA Neves
 Urayoan Noel
 Deborah Paredez
 Emmy Pérez
 Ruben Quesada
 Natalie Scenters-Zapico
 Carmen Tafolla
 Lauro Vasquez
 Javier Zamora

CantoMundo Poetry Prize
The organization has partnered with the University of Arkansas Press for an annual book prize. Edited by Deborah Paredez and Celeste Guzman, the first judge for the prize is celebrated poet Rafael Campo.

References

External links
 CantoMundo Website
 CantoMundo page on Columbia

2009 establishments in Texas
American poetry
American writers' organizations
Arts organizations based in New York City
Arts organizations established in 2009
Hispanic and Latino American organizations
Hispanic and Latino American literature
Poetry organizations